Keith Alvin Saint Hope Gardner (6 September 192925 May 2012) was a Jamaican athlete who competed in the 110 metre hurdles, 100 metres, 200 metres, and 400 metres.

He competed for the British West Indies in the 1960 Summer Olympics held in Rome, Italy in the 4 x 400 metre relay where he won the bronze medal with his teammates Malcolm Spence, James Wedderburn, and George Kerr.

References
 Profile
 Commonwealth Games Results

1929 births
2012 deaths
Jamaican male sprinters
Jamaican male hurdlers
Athletes (track and field) at the 1954 British Empire and Commonwealth Games
Athletes (track and field) at the 1955 Pan American Games
Athletes (track and field) at the 1956 Summer Olympics
Athletes (track and field) at the 1958 British Empire and Commonwealth Games
Athletes (track and field) at the 1960 Summer Olympics
Olympic athletes of Jamaica
Olympic athletes of the British West Indies
Olympic bronze medalists for the British West Indies
Commonwealth Games gold medallists for Jamaica
Commonwealth Games silver medallists for Jamaica
Commonwealth Games bronze medallists for Jamaica
Pan American Games silver medalists for Jamaica
Medalists at the 1960 Summer Olympics
Olympic bronze medalists in athletics (track and field)
Commonwealth Games medallists in athletics
Pan American Games medalists in athletics (track and field)
Central American and Caribbean Games gold medalists for Jamaica
Competitors at the 1954 Central American and Caribbean Games
Central American and Caribbean Games medalists in athletics
Medalists at the 1955 Pan American Games
Medallists at the 1954 British Empire and Commonwealth Games
Medallists at the 1958 British Empire and Commonwealth Games